Vicente da Fonseca Lucas (born 24 September 1935), known simply as Vicente, is a Portuguese retired footballer who played as a central defender.

Playing career
Born in Lourenço Marques, Portuguese Mozambique, Vicente played for C.F. Os Belenenses in 13 Primeira Liga seasons, making his debut in 1954 and winning the Portuguese Cup six years later. He earned 20 caps for Portugal, his debut coming on 3 June 1959 in a 1–0 win against Scotland.

Vicente was picked for the squad that appeared in the 1966 FIFA World Cup in England. As his nation's team went on to finish in third position, he played all the group stage matches plus the 5–3 quarter-final win against North Korea; he was accused of fouling Pelé in the 3–1 group phase victory, when it was in fact his teammate João Morais who was responsible.

Vicente quit football after the World Cup due to a serious eye injury after a piece of glass hit the organ in a car accident, aged 31. He was remembered for several perfect markings of the best players of his time without making any foul, and was cited by Pelé as the greatest defender that he ever played against.

Coaching career
From 1979 to 1981, Vicente coached in the fourth division, spending one season apiece with Clube Desportivo Amiense and G.D. Sesimbra. In 1990–91, he was one of four managers as his beloved Belenenses could not avoid top-flight relegation – he was in charge for only one game, a 1–2 defeat.

Personal life
Vicente's older brother, Sebastião, was also a footballer. A striker, he played 13 years with Belenenses (sharing teams with his sibling during ten), and also represented the Portugal national team.

See also
List of one-club men

References

External links

1935 births
Living people
Sportspeople from Maputo
Mozambican footballers
Portuguese footballers
Association football defenders
Primeira Liga players
C.F. Os Belenenses players
Portugal international footballers
1966 FIFA World Cup players
Mozambican football managers
Portuguese football managers
Primeira Liga managers
C.F. Os Belenenses managers